Thamnosma texana, the rue of the mountains, Texas desert-ru or Dutchman's breeches,is a shrub in the citrus family Rutaceae. It is native to Arizona (Hualap Mountains) to Texas and Northern Mexico.

References

External links

texana